Fifteen Will Get You Twenty is the debut extended play by Canadian pop-punk band, LiveonRelease. The album included five songs off their debut, Seeing Red, and was most likely a promotional EP.
The extended play, along with Seeing Red and Goes on a Field Trip, does not show up on sites like eBay or iTunes.

Track listing
"I'm Afraid of Britney Spears" – 3:05
"Emotional Griptape" – 3:40
"Fake"
"Johnny Johnny"
"Don't Leave Me Alone"

References
http://www.amazon.com/Fifteen-Will-Get-You-Twenty/dp/B00083B6ES
http://music.yahoo.com/liveonrelease/albums/fifteen-will-get-you-twenty--136500
https://books.google.com/books?id=tru_LMeiZNEC&pg=PA58&lpg=PA58&dq=Fifteen+Will+Get+You+Twenty+liveOnRelease&source=bl&ots=Bs9W8X1SKi&sig=dIT77LchiU3vSkswWp7mFHcVfKw&hl=en&sa=X&ei=LljqTvyeLIfx0gHl7fXkCQ&ved=0CCwQ6AEwADgK#v=onepage&q=Fifteen%20Will%20Get%20You%20Twenty%20liveOnRelease&f=false
http://www.canwwrfrom1950.org/index.php?page_id=2&show=author_works&letter=E&author=2235

2002 EPs